In mathematics, pentation (or hyper-5) is the next hyperoperation after tetration and before hexation. It is defined as iterated (repeated) tetration, just as tetration is iterated exponentiation. It is a binary operation defined with two numbers a and b, where a is tetrated to itself b-1 times. This can then be reduced to

Etymology
The word "pentation" was coined by Reuben Goodstein in 1947 from the roots penta- (five) and iteration. It is part of his general naming scheme for hyperoperations.

Notation
There is little consensus on the notation for pentation; as such, there are many different ways to write the operation. However, some are more used than others, and some have clear advantages or disadvantages compared to others.

In this format,  may be interpreted as the result of repeatedly applying the function , for  repetitions, starting from the number 1. Analogously, tetration, represents the value obtained by repeatedly applying the function , for  repetitions, starting from the number 1, and the pentation  represents the value obtained by repeatedly applying the function , for  repetitions, starting from the number 1. This will be the notation used in the rest of the article.

In this notation,  represents the exponentiation function  and  represents tetration. The operation can be easily adapted for hexation by adding another arrow.
In Conway chained arrow notation, .

Examples 

As tetration, its base operation, has not been extended to non-integer heights, pentation  is currently only defined for integer values of a and b where a > 0 and b ≥ −2, and a few other integer values which may be uniquely defined. As with all hyperoperations of order 3 (exponentiation) and higher, pentation has the following trivial cases (identities) which holds for all values of a and b within its domain:

 
 

Additionally, we can also define:

 
 
 

Other than the trivial cases shown above, pentation generates extremely large numbers very quickly such that there are only a few non-trivial cases that produce numbers that can be written in conventional notation, as illustrated below:
 
 
  (shown here in iterated exponential notation as it is far too large to be written in conventional notation. Note )
 
 
  (a number with over 10153 digits)
  (a number with more than 10102184 digits)

See also
Ackermann function
Large numbers
Graham's number
History of large numbers

References

Exponentials
Large numbers
Operations on numbers